Juan Manuel Leguizamón (born 6 June 1983) is an Argentine rugby union footballer for Rugby United New York (RUNY) of Major League Rugby (MLR). He plays as a flanker or a number eight.

Leguizamón previously played for the Jaguares, the Argentine side which made its debut in Super Rugby for the 2016 season.

He first played for Santiago Lawn Tennis Club, playing for San Isidro Club in 2003–04, where he won two URBA championships. He also played for the London Irish (2005–06, 2007–08) in England, and for Stade Français (2008–09, 2010–11) as well as Lyon OU (2011–15) in the Top 14 and Pro D2 leagues of France.

Leguizamón played 87 tests for Argentina from 2005 to 2019, including four Rugby World Cups and also captaining the team three times in his career.

International career 
Leguizamón made his debut with Los Pumas in April 2005 in a match against Japan, won 68 to 36 in Buenos Aires. On his debut, he also scored his first try for Argentina. He earned another two caps in July in a Test series against Italy, and then went on to play in three tests matches during November; against South Africa, and coming on as a replacement during the Scotland and Italy fixtures. The following year he played in two tests during the June fixtures at home to Wales and the All Blacks. He also played in games during Argentina's qualification for the 2007 Rugby World Cup and before the quarter finals, Leguizamón dominated the World Cup group stage. This was emphasised with his monstrous work rate during the first game of the tournament against the hosts France. His yellow boots make him easy to spot.

Leguizamón went on to be part of the Argentine squad for three more World Cups, the 2011 Rugby World Cup in New Zealand, 2015 Rugby World Cup in England and 2019 Rugby World Cup in Japan.
 
Having been supplanted from the starting lineup, by Javier Ortega Desio, during the 2018 Rugby Championship, Leguizamón announced that he would retire from all forms of rugby following the 2019 World Cup.

On October 9, 2019, he played his last test for the Argentina national team, a 47–17 win over the United States. Leguizamón finished his career under Head Coach, Mario Ledesma, a former teammate, and finished as the joint second-to-most capped Argentinian player of all time, tied with Felipe Contepomi and second to Agustin Creevy.

In May 2021, Leguizamón signed with Rugby United New York (RUNY) of Major League Rugby in America for the rest of the 2021 season.

References

External links
London Irish profile
UAR profile
Juan Manuel Leguizamón on Londonirish.org
Juan Manuel Leguizamón on sarugby.com
Juan Manuel Leguizamón on ercrugby.com

1983 births
People from Santiago del Estero
Argentine people of Basque descent
Argentine rugby union players
Jaguares (Super Rugby) players
Living people
Lyon OU players
Rugby union flankers
Rugby union number eights
San Isidro Club rugby union players
Stade Français players
Barbarian F.C. players
London Irish players
Argentina international rugby union players
Argentine expatriate rugby union players
Argentine expatriate sportspeople in England
Argentine expatriate sportspeople in France
Expatriate rugby union players in England
Expatriate rugby union players in France
Rugby New York players
Sportspeople from Santiago del Estero Province